Munderi is a small village in Nilambur Taluk of Malappuram District, in Kerala. It got the name from "Mount Area" as it is surrounded by mountain ranges. The un-tarred forest road from Munderi towards North through forests lead to Chooralmala (near Meppadi) in Wayanad district.

Chaliyar River
River Chaliyar originates from the Elampalari Hills, which is located near the meeting point of Malappuram, Wayanad and the Nilgiris districts; from where it flows through Thalappaali and reaches Thamburattikkallu where Neerppuzha, coming from 'Glen-rock' through 'Appangaappu' (origin: up and gap), the eastern part of Munderi joins with it as the first tributary.

Plantations
Munderi is the place where Asia's first rubber plantation was established. Munderi is also famous for its Seed Garden Complex, spread on Thamburattikkallu-Thalappali road. It is the first largest agricultural farm in Kerala and is owned by Govt. of Kerala (Dept. of Agriculture). There was a big silica stone called 'Thamburattikkallu' at the place with the same name (western part of Munderi) which was demolished and given to Excel Glass company in Alappuzha, in early 1990s.

Nearby Sports Clubs 

Flame Arts and Sports Club Thamburatikallu
Juvants Arts& Sports Club Munderi 
 Navodhanam Arts & Sports Club Munderi
 Yuvadhara Arts & Sports Club Mukkam

Nearby Towns
 Pothukal (8 Km)
 Chungathara (18 Km)
 Edakkara (19 Km)
 Nilambur (28 Km)
 Manjeri (50 Km)

Pothukallu Panchayath
Munderi is part of Pothukallu Village Panchayath administration. Pothukallu is also known for its greenery and scenic riverside villages.  Pothukallu has more hospitals, schools and shopping centers.  There is a police station in Pothukallu. This Panchayath is part of Nilambur Assembly Constituency and the MLA is Mr. P.V Anvar.

Transportation
Munderi village connects to other parts of India through Nilambur town.  State Highway No.28 starts from Nilambur and connects to Ooty, Mysore and Bangalore through Highways.12,29 and 181. National highway No.66 passes through Ramanattukara and the northern stretch connects to Goa and Mumbai.  The southern stretch connects to Cochin and Trivandrum. The nearest airport is at Kozhikode.  The nearest major railway station is at Shornur.

Villages and Suburbs
 Palunda
 Pathirippadam
 Nallanthanny
 Puthiyangadi
 Sulthanpadi
 Chathamunda
 Uppada
 Anakkallu
 Nettikkulam
 Pothukallu
 Kunippala 
 Velumbiyampadam 
 Ambittampotti 
 Neerppuzha Mukkam 
 Thamburattikkallu
 Munderi

Important Landmarks

 Seed Garden Complex, Munderi
 Sirajul Hudha Madrasa, Thamburattikkallu
 Sree Dharmasastha Temple, Thamburattikkallu
 Sunni Juma Masjid, Munderi
 St George Catholic church Munderi
 Up and gap road
 Milk Society
 Munderi Mar Baselious Orthodox Church

References

Villages in Malappuram district
Nilambur area